Brighton, Hove & Sussex Sixth Form College, usually abbreviated to BHASVIC (pronounced "Baz-vic"), is a sixth form college in Brighton and Hove, England for 16- to 19-year-old students. The college is in the Prestonville area of the city.  It is situated at the corner of Dyke Road (A2010) and the Old Shoreham Road (A270), a major road junction in the north-west of the city of Brighton & Hove in Seven Dials.

History
The college has its origins in the Brighton Proprietary Grammar and Commercial School, founded in July 1859 at Lancaster House, Grand Parade. The school continued as the Brighton, Hove and Sussex Grammar School. It opened on its present site in 1913. During the First World War, the building was requisitioned by the War Office to create the 2nd Eastern General Hospital, a facility for the Royal Army Medical Corps to treat military casualties. A large library was added to the building in 1935. The grammar school was abolished in 1975 and replaced by the current sixth form college.

Funding and governance
BHASVIC and other sixth form colleges in England were transferred under the Further and Higher Education Act 1992 out of local government control and established as independent FE Corporations. On 1 April 2010, under the Apprentices, Schools, Children and Learning Act 2009, the college was designated as a sixth form college. Over 90% of the college's funds come from the EFA (Education Funding Agency). Corporation Members (governors) are individuals from business, the local community, staff, students and parents. The principal of the college is an ex-officio member of the corporation.

In April 2017, governors decided against seeking academy status.

Teaching

There are approximately 2,800 students in college, most of whom take Advanced level courses. The remaining students are enrolled in variety of courses, predominantly Vocational Intermediate level or GCSE programmes. Approximately 60% of students are from Brighton and Hove, and up to 40 students come from outside the United Kingdom.

OFSTED published a report on its assessment of BHASVIC in November 2012, and BHASVIC was the first college in the country to be awarded a grade 1 Outstanding by OFSTED under the new inspection framework.

The Prime Minister's Global Fellowship
The college has a good record of students attaining places on the Prime Minister's Global Fellowship programme. The college achieved its first student in the inaugural year of the programme, 2008 and in 2009 had 2 more successful applicants.

Notable alumni

Brighton Hove & Sussex Sixth Form College
Philippa Gardner, Professor of Theoretical Computer Science, Imperial College London
Phil Hobden, filmmaker
Jamie Theakston, television presenter

As Brighton, Hove and Sussex Grammar School
 Ernest Frederick Beal, VC 
 Walter Adams CMG OBE, Director from 1967 to 1974 of the London School of Economics (LSE), and Principal from 1955 to 1967 of the University College of Rhodesia and Nyasaland
 Aubrey Beardsley, illustrator
 Professor Henry Bedson, virologist
Stanley Bindoff — Historian and academic
 Howard Blake, OBE, composer
 Neil Brand, film composer
 Charles B. Cochran, theatre producer
 Christopher Dow, economist
 Vice Admiral Anthony Dymock CB, UK Military Representative to NATO from 2006 to 2008
 Michael Fabricant, bouffant-coiffed Conservative MP from 1992 to 1997 for Mid Staffordshire and since 1997 for Lichfield
 David Feldman, Emeritus Rouse Ball Professor of English Law at the University of Cambridge
 John Gillingham, Professor of History from 1995 to 1998 at the LSE
 John Glover, cricketer
 Maj-Gen John Gould CB, the Army's Paymaster-in-Chief from 1972 to 1975
 Tony Hawks, comedian
 John Hay, Conservative MP from 1950 to 1974 for Henley, and President from 1977 to 1981 of the Council of European Municipalities and Regions
 Gilbert Walter King OBE, judge of the British Supreme Court for China
 Sir Ivan Lawrence, Conservative MP from 1974 to 1997 for Burton
 Rear Admiral John Lippiett CB CBE, chief executive since 2003 of the Mary Rose Trust
 Vice Admiral Sir Fabian Malbon, commanded HMS Invincible in 1992–93 and Lieutenant Governor of Guernsey 2005-2011
 Keith Simpson, pathologist
 Charles Stapley, actor in Crossroads
 The Very Reverend Michael Till, former Dean of Winchester
 Alan Weeks, BBC ice-skating commentator

Further reading

See also
 Buildings and architecture of Brighton and Hove
 City College Brighton & Hove

References

External links
 bhasvic.ac.uk – College's website
 Origins of BHASVIC on My Brighton and Hove (local history website)

Educational institutions established in 1859
Education in Brighton and Hove
Sixth form colleges in East Sussex
1859 establishments in the United Kingdom